The 1960 Kansas Jayhawks football team represented the University of Kansas during the 1960 NCAA University Division football season. The Jayhawks were led by third-year head coach Jack Mitchell and played their home games at Memorial Stadium in Lawrence, Kansas.

Kansas started the season with an upset over No. 11 TCU, shooting them up the polls. Losses were suffered to two top-two teams in No. 2 Syracuse and No 1. Iowa, as well as a tie to Oklahoma. The Jayhawks ended the regular season with an upset victory over their arch-rivals and previously-undefeated and top-ranked Missouri. Their victory earned them their first outright Big Eight Conference championship since 1930 and an invitation to the Orange Bowl. They finished No. 11 in the final AP Poll, their second ever ranked finish, and first since 1947.

Controversy surrounded the end of the season, however, as Kansas was found to have fielded an ineligible player, Bert Coan, in their games against Colorado and Missouri. The Big 8 Conference considers those games to be forfeits by Kansas, though Kansas and the NCAA recognize Kansas' on-field victories. The forfeited games remain a topic of dispute in the Border War.

Schedule

References

Kansas
Kansas Jayhawks football seasons
Kansas Jayhawks football